The 2018–19 Scottish Lowland Football League (known as the Geosonic Lowland League for sponsorship reasons) was the 6th season of the Lowland Football League, the fifth tier of the Scottish football pyramid system. The season began on 28 July 2018 and ended on 20 April 2019. Spartans were the defending champions.

East of Scotland League champions Kelty Hearts joined the league after becoming the first club to gain promotion via the Lowland League play-off, thanks to their win against South of Scotland League winners Threave Rovers at the end of the previous season.

Selkirk resigned at the end of August after fulfilling three league games, reducing the number of clubs to 15. Their league defeats to East Kilbride (10–0), Civil Service Strollers (0–5) and Gretna 2008 (0–8) were expunged.

East Kilbride won their second league title on 26 March 2019 thanks to a 2–1 win over Spartans at K-Park, with three matches still to play. They faced the winners of the 2018–19 Highland Football League (Cove Rangers) in the Pyramid play-off, losing 5-1 on aggregate.

Teams

The following teams have changed division since the 2017–18 season.

To Lowland League
Promoted from East of Scotland League
 Kelty Hearts

From Lowland League
Relegated to East of Scotland League
 Hawick Royal Albert

Stadia and locations

League table

Results

Lowland League play-off
A play-off was due to take place between the winners of the 2018–19 East of Scotland Football League and the 2018–19 South of Scotland Football League. However South of Scotland League champions Stranraer reserves were ineligible for promotion due to being a reserve team.

Initially, the winners of the East of Scotland League (Bonnyrigg Rose Athletic) did not meet the required licensing criteria for promotion at the end of the season. However they were eventually awarded their SFA licence on 14 June 2019 and were confirmed as promoted to the 2019–20 Lowland Football League on the same day.

References

Lowland Football League seasons
5
Scottish